Lance Corporal Haji Mohammad Yusof bin Haji Matyassin (born 12 March 1985) is a Bruneian international footballer who last played with MS ABDB of the Brunei Super League as a defender. He had a one-year stint with Brunei's sole professional club DPMM FC in 2014.

Club career
A career soldier with the Royal Brunei Armed Forces, Yusof began playing for the army's football team in the Brunei Premier League I in 2006, scoring in the Brunei League Cup final of that year. He has won the Brunei FA Cup a total of six times with the armymen, the latest one in 2016.

Yusof was selected to play for Brunei DPMM FC in 2014. He was released without making an appearance at the end of the season. He rejoined MS ABDB in 2015 and finally won the Bruneian league championship after long last.

International career
Yusof made his first appearance for the Brunei national football team at the 2008 AFC Challenge Cup qualification round against Philippines in a 0–1 loss on 13 May. He started all three qualification games but Brunei only gained one point against Bhutan.

Yusof was included in the Brunei squad to face Chinese Taipei for the 2018 World Cup qualifying matches in March 2015, but did not take the field. He appeared as a second-half substitute in a friendly against Singapore on 6 June 2015. He was selected for the 2016 AFF Suzuki Cup qualification held in Cambodia in October 2016 and made one appearance, coming on as a first-half stoppage time substitute for the injured Najib Tarif in the 2–1 win against Timor-Leste.

Honours

MS ABDB
 Brunei Super League (4): 2015, 2016, 2017–18, 2018–19
 Brunei FA Cup (6): 2007–08, 2010, 2012–13, 2014–15, 2015, 2016
 Brunei League Cup: 2006

External links

References 

1985 births
Living people
Association football defenders
Bruneian military personnel
Bruneian footballers
Brunei international footballers
MS ABDB players